In mathematics, and more specifically in abstract algebra, an element x of a *-algebra is self-adjoint if  . A self-adjoint element is also  Hermitian, though the reverse doesn't necessarily hold.

A collection C of elements of a star-algebra is self-adjoint if it is closed under the involution operation. For example, if  then since  in a star-algebra, the set {x,y} is a self-adjoint set even though x and y need not be self-adjoint elements.

In functional analysis, a linear operator  on a Hilbert space is called self-adjoint if it is equal to its own adjoint A. See self-adjoint operator for a detailed discussion. If the Hilbert space is finite-dimensional and an orthonormal basis has been chosen, then the operator A is self-adjoint if and only if the matrix describing A with respect to this basis is Hermitian, i.e. if it is equal to its own conjugate transpose. Hermitian matrices are also called self-adjoint.

In a dagger category, a morphism  is called self-adjoint if ; this is possible only for an endomorphism .

See also
 Hermitian matrix
 Normal element
 Symmetric matrix
 Self-adjoint operator
 Unitary element

References 

 
 

Abstract algebra
Linear algebra